The 1965 French Championships (now known as the French Open) was a tennis tournament that took place on the outdoor clay courts at the Stade Roland-Garros in Paris, France. The tournament ran from 17 May until 29 May. It was the 69th staging of the French Championships, and the second Grand Slam tennis event of 1965. Fred Stolle and Lesley Turner won the singles titles.

Finals

Men's singles

 Fred Stolle (AUS) defeated  Tony Roche (AUS) 3–6, 6–0, 6–2, 6–3

Women's singles

 Lesley Turner (AUS) defeated  Margaret Smith (AUS)  6–3, 6–4

Men's doubles

 Roy Emerson (AUS) /   Fred Stolle (AUS) defeated  Ken Fletcher (AUS) /  Bob Hewitt (AUS) 6–8, 6–3, 8–6, 6–2

Women's doubles

 Margaret Smith (AUS) /  Lesley Turner (AUS) defeated  Françoise Durr (FRA) /  Janine Lieffrig (FRA) 6–3, 6–1

Mixed doubles

 Margaret Smith (AUS) /  Ken Fletcher (AUS) defeated  Maria Bueno (BRA) /  John Newcombe (AUS)  6–4, 6–4

References

External links
 French Open official website

French Championships
French Championships (tennis) by year
French Championships (tennis)
French Championships (tennis)
French Championships (tennis)